Bruch may refer to the following

 Bruch, Lot-et-Garonne, a commune in the Lot-et-Garonne département, France
 Bruch, Rhineland-Palatinate, a municipality in the district Bernkastel-Wittlich, Rhineland-Palatinate, Germany
 the old German names of Lom (Strakonice District) and Lom u Mostu in the Czech Republic
 Bruch's membrane, the innermost layer of the choroid in the eye
 5004 Bruch, an asteroid

People with the surname
 Bobby Bruch (born 1966), American association football player
 Carl Friedrich Bruch (1789–1857), German ornithologist
 Carlos Bruch born Franz Karl Bruch (1869-1943), German-born Argentinian entomologist
 Ernst Brüche (1900–1985), German physicist
 Hilde Bruch (1904–1984), psychoanalyst, expert on eating disorders
 Klaus vom Bruch (born 1952), German video artist
 Max Bruch (1838–1920), German composer
 Ricky Bruch (1946–2011), Swedish athlete
 Volker Bruch (born 1980), German actor
 Walter Bruch (1908–1990), German engineer

See also

German-language surnames